Joseph Jacobs (1854–1916) was an Australian folklorist, literary critic and historian.

Joseph Jacobs may also refer to:
Joseph Jacobs (magician) (1813–1870), English magician
Joseph J. Jacobs (1916–2004), American chemical engineer
Joseph E. Jacobs (1893–1971), US diplomat
Josef Jacobs (1894–1978), German pilot
 Joey Jacobs (boxer, born 1960), British boxer 
 Joey Jacobs Sr. (born 1937), his father, British boxer 
 Joey Jacobs (footballer) (born 2000), Dutch footballer
Joe Jacobs (American football) (born 1970), Arena Football league player
Joe Jacobs (actor) (born 1983), English actor
Joe Jacobs (speedway rider) (born 1993), British speedway rider
Joe Jacobs (Emmerdale)

See also
Joseph Jacob (disambiguation)